Professor Sivalingam Sivananthan is an American academic, scientist, businessman and Director of the Microphysics Laboratory at the University of Illinois at Chicago.

Early life and family

Sivananthan was born in Madduvil South near Chavakachcheri in northern Ceylon. His father was a Tamil scholar from Valvettithurai and his mother was teacher of religion and science. He was educated at Saraswathi Maha Vidyalayam, Drieberg College and Jaffna Hindu College (1968–75). After school he joined the University of Peradeniya's Science Faculty in 1976, graduating in 1980 with a BS degree in physics.

Career
After graduating Sivananthan lectured at Eastern University, Sri Lanka before joining the University of Illinois at Chicago in 1982 for post-graduate study. He obtained MSc (1985) and PhD (1988) degrees from the university. He is currently a Distinguished Professor and Director of the Microphysics Laboratory at the university's Department of Physics.

Sivananthan entered business in 1998 when he founded EPIR Technologies Inc. Sivananthan is also founder and CEO of Sivananthan Laboratories Inc. based in Bolingbrook, Illinois.

In May 2013 Sivananthan was awarded the "Champion of Change" (Immigrant Entrepreneurs and Innovators category) by the White House. He was awarded the Vidya Nidhi title in the 2017 Sri Lankan national honours. In 2010 he was elected a Fellow of the American Physical Society for "seminal contributions to the growth technology of II-VI photovoltaic materials.".

References

External links
 
 

Academic staff of the Eastern University, Sri Lanka
Alumni of Jaffna Hindu College
Alumni of the University of Peradeniya
American people of Sri Lankan Tamil descent
Fellows of the American Physical Society
Living people
People from Northern Province, Sri Lanka
Sri Lankan Tamil academics
Sri Lankan Tamil businesspeople
Sri Lankan Tamil physicists
Sri Lankan Tamil writers
University of Illinois Chicago alumni
University of Illinois Chicago faculty
Vidya Nidhi
Year of birth missing (living people)